The dozen or so Ninzic languages are a branch of the Plateau family spoken in central Nigeria.

Classification
There is little data on the Ninzic languages, and it is not clear that all of the following languages are related. Blench (2008) lists the following languages, twice as many as Greenberg 1963 ("Plateau IV"). They are not subclassified apart from a few obvious dialect clusters.

Ce (Che, Rukuba), Ninzo (Ninzam), Mada, Ninkyop (Kaninkwom)–Nindem, Kanufi (Anib), Gwantu (Gbantu), Bu-Ninkada (Bu), Ningye, Nungu, Ninka, Gbətsu, Nkɔ

and perhaps Ayu.

Names and locations
Below is a list of language names, populations, and locations from Blench (2019).

Footnotes

References
Blench (2008) Prospecting proto-Plateau. Manuscript.

External links
Roger Blench: Ninzic materials

 
Plateau languages